Cesáreo Chacaltana Reyes (February 25, 1845 – November 14, 1906) was a Peruvian lawyer, jurist, diplomat and politician. He was born in Lima, Peru. He graduated from the National University of San Marcos and served on its faculty. He was a member of the Civilista Party. He was mayor of Lima in 1886. He was a member of the Chamber of Deputies of Peru and Senate of Peru. He served as minister of foreign affairs and interior in the Government of Peru, and also served as Minister to Argentina, Uruguay, Paraguay, and Chile. He served twice as Prime Minister of Peru (August–November 1894, September 1901 – August 1902) and briefly second vice president of Peru from 1894 to 1895. He served as the President of the Chamber of Deputies from 1904 to 1905.

References

Works
Patronato Nacional Argentino. Cuestiones de actualidad sobre las recíprocas relaciones de la Iglesia y el Estado (Buenos Aires, 1895).
Programa de Derecho Civil Común (1896).
Derecho Civil Común (1897).

Bibliography
Basadre, Jorge: Historia de la República del Perú. 1822 - 1933, Octava Edición, corregida y aumentada. Tomos 8 y 9. Editada por el Diario "La República" de Lima y la Universidad "Ricardo Palma". Impreso en Santiago de Chile, 1998.
Tauro del Pino, Alberto: Enciclopedia Ilustrada del Perú. Tercera Edición. Tomo 4, CAN/CHO. Lima, PEISA, 2001. 

1845 births
1906 deaths
19th-century Peruvian lawyers
Mayors of Lima
Peruvian jurists
People from Lima
Civilista Party politicians
Vice presidents of Peru
Peruvian diplomats
Presidents of the Chamber of Deputies of Peru
Foreign ministers of Peru
Peruvian Ministers of Interior
National University of San Marcos alumni
Academic staff of the National University of San Marcos
Members of the Senate of Peru